The DSB Class MX is a lightweight, diesel-electric locomotive built by the Swedish company Nydqist & Holm between 1960 and 1962 for the Danish State Railways

History 
After having great success with the MY locos, DSB started to search for a lighter locomotive for some of the smaller stretches on which the MYs were too heavy to run.

The first unit, 1001 arrived to Denmark in 1960 and got just as popular as its big-brothers in short time - the first 20 units (1001–1020) produced  whilst the last units, 1020-1045 produced .

Many of the MXs have been sold to Danish private railways, but some have also been sold to Sweden and some other countries. In Sweden they are called TMX, as diesel locomotive class designations usually begin with T there. Informally nicknamed Gammel Dansk referring to the popular herbal liquor associated with Denmark, whilst also being a popular name as it means "Old Danish" literally translated.

See also 
DSB class MY

External links 

 Jernbanesider
 Ravnsbak
 GM-nyt

MX 1001
NOHAB locomotives
A1A-A1A locomotives
Railway locomotives introduced in 1960
Diesel-electric locomotives of Denmark
Standard gauge locomotives of Denmark